Iahweh was a Brazilian Christian rock/metal band, originating in São Paulo, Brazil.

Biography 

The band was founded in São Paulo and released its Alfa e Ômega album, in 1996. Due to internal problems, the band went into hiatus, but returned in 2008 to release the album Neblim, which included the tracks "Misericórdia, Senhor" and "Ruah".

In 2009, the group won the first Louvemos ao Senhor Trophy in the Best Rock Album category. In 2010, the band released their first music video for the orchestrated version of their song "Neblim".

In 2012, Iahweh's lead singer André Leite left the band to join the Rio De Janeiro-based group Hangar.

On March 5, 2014, coinciding with the carnival on Ash Wednesday, Iahweh released a new clip with the participation of Father Fábio de Melo entitled "Deserto," which was also the name of their third CD released later in the same month.

Members 

 André Leite – Vocals 
 Toninho de Marco – Guitar 
 Alessandro Bittencourt – Bass
 Tiago Mattos – Guitar 
 Eloy Casagrande – Drums

Past members 

 Neli Sestari
 Júlio César

Discography 

 1996 – Alfa e Ômega 2008 – Neblim
 2014 – Deserto

 Videography 

 Videos 

 2010 – "Neblim"
 2014 – "Deserto"

 Awards 

{| class="wikitable" style=text-align:center;
|-
!Year
!width=200|Album
!Category 
!Result
|-
| 2009 
| align=left|Neblim'''
| I Louvemos o Senhor Trophy
 Category 12: Best Rock Album
|

See also 
 Rosa de Saron
 Ceremonya

References 

Brazilian Christian rock groups
Brazilian Roman Catholic musical groups
Musical groups from São Paulo (state)
Musical groups established in 1993
Musical groups disestablished in 2015
Brazilian Christian metal musical groups
Musical quintets